This is a list of Tricholoma species found in North America.

Tricholoma acre
Tricholoma aestuans
Tricholoma albidum
Tricholoma apium - scented knight
Tricholoma argenteum
Tricholoma arvernense
Tricholoma atrodiscum
Tricholoma atrosquamosum - dark scaled knight
Tricholoma atroviolaceum
Tricholoma aurantio-olivaceum
Tricholoma aurantium - orange knight
Tricholoma caligatum
Tricholoma cingulatum - girdled knight
Tricholoma colossus - giant knight
Tricholoma davisiae
Tricholoma dryophilum
Tricholoma equestre - yellow knight
Tricholoma farinaceum
Tricholoma floridanum
Tricholoma focale - booted knight
Tricholoma fracticum
Tricholoma fulvimarginatum
Tricholoma fulvum - birch knight
Tricholoma fumosoluteum
Tricholoma griseoviolaceum
Tricholoma hordum
Tricholoma huronense
Tricholoma imbricatum - matt knight
Tricholoma inamoenum
Tricholoma insigne
Tricholoma intermedium
Tricholoma luteomaculosum
Tricholoma magnivelare
Tricholoma manzanitae
Tricholoma marquettense
Tricholoma moseri
Tricholoma muricatum
Tricholoma mutabile
Tricholoma myomyces
Tricholoma nigrum
Tricholoma niveipes
Tricholoma odorum
Tricholoma olivaceobrunneum
Tricholoma palustre
Tricholoma pardinum
Tricholoma pessundatum
Tricholoma populinum - poplar knight
Tricholoma portentosum
Tricholoma pullum
Tricholoma roseoacerbum
Tricholoma saponaceum - soapy knight
Tricholoma sculpturatum - yellowing knight (now a redirect)
Tricholoma sejunctum - deceiving knight
Tricholoma serratifolium
Tricholoma silvaticoides
Tricholoma squarrulosum
Tricholoma subaureum
Tricholoma subluteum
Tricholoma subresplendens
Tricholoma sulphurescens
Tricholoma sulphureum - sulphur knight
Tricholoma terreum - grey knight
Tricholoma transmutans
Tricholoma tumidum
Tricholoma ustale - burnt knight
Tricholoma vaccinum - scaly knight
Tricholoma venenatum
Tricholoma vernaticum
Tricholoma virgatum - ashen knight

References

Tricholoma